Rhamphomyia is a genus of dance flies, in the fly family Empididae.

Species 

The species of Rhamphomyia are arranged into subgenera, as follows:

Aclonempis Collin, 1926
Rhamphomyia albohirta Collin, 1926
Rhamphomyia andalusiaca Strobl, 1899
Rhamphomyia clypeata Macquart, 1834
Rhamphomyia eupterota Loew, 1873
Rhamphomyia galactoptera Strobl, 1893
Rhamphomyia gibbifera Strobl, 1906
Rhamphomyia leptopus Loew, 1873
Rhamphomyia longipes (Meigen, 1804)
Rhamphomyia mariobezzii Barták, 2001
Rhamphomyia minor Oldenberg, 1922
Rhamphomyia nox Oldenberg, 1917
Rhamphomyia nubes (Collin, 1969)
Rhamphomyia umbripes Becker, 1887
Amydroneura Collin, 1926
Rhamphomyia bipila Strobl, 1909
Rhamphomyia claripennis Oldenberg, 1922
Rhamphomyia crassicauda Strobl, 1893
Rhamphomyia erythrophthalma Meigen, 1830
Rhamphomyia gibba (Fallén, 1816)
Rhamphomyia hirsutipes Collin, 1926
Rhamphomyia pseudogibba Strobl, 1910
Eorhamphomyia
Rhamphomyia shewelli Sinclair, Vajda, Saigusa & Shamshev, 2019
Holoclera Schiner, 1860
Rhamphomyia biserialis (Collin, 1960)
Rhamphomyia bistriata Strobl, 1910
Rhamphomyia caliginosa Collin, 1926
Rhamphomyia culicina (Fallén, 1816)
Rhamphomyia flava (Fallén, 1816)
Rhamphomyia flaviventris Macquart, 1827
Rhamphomyia heterochroma Bezzi, 1898
Rhamphomyia lamellata Collin, 1926
Rhamphomyia morenae Strobl, 1899
Rhamphomyia nigripennis (Fabricius, 1794)
Rhamphomyia sciarina (Fallén, 1816)
Rhamphomyia trigemina Oldenberg, 1927
Rhamphomyia umbripennis Meigen, 1822
Rhamphomyia variabilis (Fallén, 1816)
Lundstroemiella Frey, 1922
Rhamphomyia aterrima Frey, 1922
Rhamphomyia australis Frey, 1922
Rhamphomyia brevistylata Oldenberg, 1927
Rhamphomyia cervi Barták, 2006
Rhamphomyia cimrmani Barták, 2006
Rhamphomyia dalmatica Oldenberg, 1927
Rhamphomyia dudai Oldenberg, 1927
Rhamphomyia freyi Barták, 1984
Rhamphomyia granadensis Chvála, 1981
Rhamphomyia hybotina Zetterstedt, 1838
Rhamphomyia kerteszi Oldenberg, 1927
Rhamphomyia longefilata Strobl, 1906
Rhamphomyia magellensis Frey, 1922
Rhamphomyia nigripes Strobl, 1898
Rhamphomyia rupestris Oldenberg, 1927
Rhamphomyia sphenoptera Loew, 1873
Rhamphomyia speighti Barták, 2006
Rhamphomyia strobli Barták, 1985
Rhamphomyia tumiditarsis Oldenberg, 1917
Megacyttarus Bigot, 1880
Rhamphomyia anomala Oldenberg, 1915
Rhamphomyia anomalina Zetterstedt, 1838
Rhamphomyia anomalipennis Meigen, 1822
Rhamphomyia crassirostris (Fallén, 1816)
Rhamphomyia gufitar Frey, 1922
Rhamphomyia maculipennis Zetterstedt, 1842
Rhamphomyia nodipes (Fallén, 1816)
Rhamphomyia paradoxa Wahlberg, 1844
Rhamphomyia poissoni (Trehen, 1966)

Pararhamphomyia Frey, 1922
Rhamphomyia aethiops Zetterstedt, 1838
Rhamphomyia albidiventris Strobl, 1898
Rhamphomyia albipennis (Fallén, 1816)
Rhamphomyia albissima Frey, 1913
Rhamphomyia albitarsis Collin, 1926
Rhamphomyia alpina Zetterstedt, 1838
Rhamphomyia amoena Loew, 1840
Rhamphomyia anfractuosa Bezzi, 1904
Rhamphomyia angulifera Frey, 1913
Rhamphomyia aperta Zetterstedt, 1859
Rhamphomyia atra Meigen, 1822
Rhamphomyia barbata (Macquart, 1823)
Rhamphomyia breviventris Frey, 1913
Rhamphomyia caesia Meigen, 1822
Rhamphomyia caudata Zetterstedt, 1838
Rhamphomyia chibinensis Frey, 1922
Rhamphomyia cribrata Oldenberg, 1927
Rhamphomyia curvula Frey, 1913
Rhamphomyia dentata Oldenberg, 1910
Rhamphomyia fascipennis Zetterstedt, 1838
Rhamphomyia filicauda Frey, 1950
Rhamphomyia frigida Sinclair, Vajda, Saigusa & Shamshev, 2019
Rhamphomyia fuscipennis Zetterstedt, 1838
Rhamphomyia fuscula Zetterstedt, 1838
Rhamphomyia geniculata Meigen, 1830
Rhamphomyia griseola Zetterstedt, 1838
Rhamphomyia helleni Frey, 1922
Rhamphomyia hirtula Zetterstedt, 1842
Rhamphomyia lamelliseta Ringdahl, 1928
Rhamphomyia lapponica Frey, 1955
Rhamphomyia lividiventris Zetterstedt, 1838
Rhamphomyia lucidula Zetterstedt, 1842
Rhamphomyia lymaniana Sinclair, Vajda, Saigusa & Shamshev, 2019
Rhamphomyia marginata (Fabricius, 1787)
Rhamphomyia micropyga Collin, 1926
Rhamphomyia modesta Wahlberg, 1844
Rhamphomyia murina Collin, 1926
Rhamphomyia niveipennis Zetterstedt, 1838
Rhamphomyia nudipes Oldenberg, 1927
Rhamphomyia obscura Zetterstedt, 1838
Rhamphomyia obscuripennis Meigen, 1830
Rhamphomyia petervajdai Sinclair, Vajda, Saigusa & Shamshev, 2019
Rhamphomyia physoprocta Frey, 1913
Rhamphomyia pilifer Meigen, 1838
Rhamphomyia plumifera Zetterstedt, 1838
Rhamphomyia poplitea Wahlberg, 1844
Rhamphomyia praestans Frey, 1913
Rhamphomyia pusilla Zetterstedt, 1838
Rhamphomyia sareptana Frey, 1950
Rhamphomyia septentrionalis Sinclair, Vajda, Saigusa & Shamshev, 2019
Rhamphomyia simplex Zetterstedt, 1849
Rhamphomyia subglaucella Frey, 1922
Rhamphomyia tarsata Meigen, 1822
Rhamphomyia tenuiterfilata Becker, 1900
Rhamphomyia tibiella Zetterstedt, 1842
Rhamphomyia tipularia (Fallén, 1816)
Rhamphomyia unguiculata Frey, 1913
Rhamphomyia Meigen, 1822
Rhamphomyia albonigra Frey, 1950
Rhamphomyia albosegmentata Zetterstedt, 1838
Rhamphomyia anthracina Meigen, 1822
Rhamphomyia anthracinella Strobl, 1898
Rhamphomyia argentata von Roder, 1887
Rhamphomyia armimana Oldenberg, 1910
Rhamphomyia aucta Oldenberg, 1917
Rhamphomyia basispinosa Frey, 1950
Rhamphomyia beckeriella Chvála, 1985
Rhamphomyia bellinosetosa Barták, 2007
Rhamphomyia biroi Bezzi, 1908
Rhamphomyia brevipila Oldenberg, 1922
Rhamphomyia caeca Collin, 1933
Rhamphomyia candidula Collin, 1933
Rhamphomyia chionoptera Bezzi, 1904
Rhamphomyia cinerascens (Meigen, 1804)
Rhamphomyia coracina Zetterstedt, 1849
Rhamphomyia crassimana Strobl, 1898
Rhamphomyia crinita Becker, 1887
Rhamphomyia curvinervis Oldenberg, 1915
Rhamphomyia czizeki Barták, 1982
Rhamphomyia discoidalis Becker, 1889
Rhamphomyia dorsata Becker, 1915
Rhamphomyia eminens Collin, 1933
Rhamphomyia erecta Barták, 1998
Rhamphomyia galbanata Collin, 1933
Rhamphomyia gracilitarsis Frey, 1950
Rhamphomyia hambergi Frey, 1916
Rhamphomyia hercynica Oldenberg, 1927
Rhamphomyia hirtimana Oldenberg, 1922
Rhamphomyia hungarica (Weber, 1969)
Rhamphomyia ignobilis Zetterstedt, 1859
Rhamphomyia interserta Collin, 1933
Rhamphomyia janovensis Barták, 1981
Rhamphomyia kreischi Barták, 1998
Rhamphomyia laevipes (Fallén, 1816)
Rhamphomyia latifrons Frey, 1913
Rhamphomyia lautereri Barták, 1981
Rhamphomyia lindneri Barták, 1998
Rhamphomyia loewi Nowicki, 1868
Rhamphomyia longicauda Loew, 1861
Rhamphomyia longirostris (Lindner, 1972)
Rhamphomyia luridipennis Nowicki, 1868
Rhamphomyia melania Becker, 1887
Rhamphomyia micans Oldenberg, 1915
Rhamphomyia mollis Collin, 1933
Rhamphomyia montana Oldenberg, 1915
Rhamphomyia morio Zetterstedt, 1838
Rhamphomyia nevadensis Lindner, 1962
Rhamphomyia nigrita Zetterstedt, 1838
Rhamphomyia nigromaculata von Roser, 1840
Rhamphomyia nitidolineata Frey, 1913
Rhamphomyia nitidula Zetterstedt, 1842
Rhamphomyia nubigena Bezzi, 1904
Rhamphomyia palmeni Frey, 1913
Rhamphomyia parvicellulata Frey, 1922
Rhamphomyia piedmontensis Barták, 2007
Rhamphomyia plumipes (Meigen, 1804)
Rhamphomyia pokornyi Bezzi, 1904
Rhamphomyia ponti Barták, 2007
Rhamphomyia reflexa Zetterstedt, 1838
Rhamphomyia saintbaumensis (Meigen, 1804)
Rhamphomyia sanctimauritii Becker, 1887
Rhamphomyia scitula Frey, 1922
Rhamphomyia sellacrinita Barták, 2007
Rhamphomyia seposita Collin, 1933
Rhamphomyia serpentata Loew, 1856
Rhamphomyia siebecki Strobl, 1898
Rhamphomyia spinipes (Fallén, 1816)
Rhamphomyia spinosipes Oldenberg, 1915
Rhamphomyia stigmosa Macquart, 1827
Rhamphomyia subcinarescens Collin, 1926
Rhamphomyia subdolomitica Barták, 1981
Rhamphomyia sulcata (Meigen, 1804)
Rhamphomyia sulcatella Collin, 1926
Rhamphomyia sulcatina Collin, 1926
Rhamphomyia tibialis Meigen, 1822
Rhamphomyia tristriolata Nowicki, 1868
Rhamphomyia ursina Oldenberg, 1915
Rhamphomyia vesiculosa (Fallén, 1816)
Rhamphomyia wagneri Barták, 1998
incertae sedis
Rhamphomyia albogeniculata von Roser, 1840
Rhamphomyia nasoni Coquillett, 1895

Images
images at Barcode of Life Data System

See also
 List of Rhamphomyia species

References

Empidoidea genera
Rhamphomyia